Sho-Bud is a brand name for a manufacturer of pedal steel guitars that was founded by Shot Jackson and Buddy Emmons in 1955 in Madison, Tennessee.

History
In the early 1950s Shot installed string pullers with pedals on Fender, Rickenbacker, and other steel guitars. Shot approached steel guitarist Bud Isaacs to start the Sho-Bud company together, using the terms "Sho" named after Shot Jackson and "Bud" after Bud Isaacs. Bud Isaacs was an early partner in the endeavor, and was involved in designing the guitars but later left, after which Shot approached steel guitarist Buddy Emmons. In 1955 Buddy Emmons joined Shot and the two continued the endeavor to create the brand and company.

The brand was founded in a small garage in 1955 in Madison, Tennessee by Shot Jackson and Buddy Emmons, both active steel players in the 1950s. The company later relocated to Nashville, Tennessee in 1963. 

In 1963 Emmons left the company, and Shot's sons, David and Harry, accompanied Shot in building Sho-Bud Steel Guitars. Duane Marrs then joined the company. David Shot was involved in designing the first "all pull" mechanics of the company's steel pedal guitars, which allowed for more musical flexibility. Later in 1963, Buddy Emmons left Sho-Bud to start his Emmons Guitar Company with Ron Lashley.

In the 1970s they also expanded their line and offered acoustic guitars. They also made a line of dobro-style resonator guitars in conjunction with Gretsch under the name Sho-Bro, a play on the word "dobro". The name is currently owned by Gretsch, which purchased the company in 1979, and there are no models in production.

Pedal steel models
Models produced include the Permanent, Fingertip, Crossover, Maverick, Professional, Pro I, Pro II, Pro III, Super Pro and LDG (Lloyd Green).

Notes

References

External links

 
Jacksonsteelguitars.com
https://web.archive.org/web/20161026193248/http://www.locobox.com/shobudacoustic/
Pete Drake Member of the Musician's Hall of Fame for Steel Guitar and player of Sho-bud guitars.

Guitar manufacturing companies of the United States
Steel guitar